StarSoldier is a science fiction board wargame published by Simulations Publications, Inc. (SPI) in 1977.

Description
StarSoldier is a 2-player game in which one player controls invading aliens, and the other controls StarSoldiers defending the planet.

Components
The game box holds:
22" x 34" paper hex grid map
400 counters
rule book
two Level Record Charts
two six-sided dice

Publication history
In 1974, SPI published StarForce: Alpha Centauri, the first mass market science fiction game. It sold very well, staying on SPI's Top Ten Bestseller list for four years. As a result, SPI created two spin-off games, Outreach in 1976 and StarSoldier in 1977. StarSoldier was designed by Tom Walczyk, with artwork by Redmond A. Simonsen. When both Outreach and StarSoldier proved popular, SPI packaged them and Star Force in one box as StarForce Trilogy. 

StarSoldier debuted on SPI's monthly Top 10 list at No. 9 two months before its release due to pre-publication orders. When it was published in January 1977, it immediately rose to No. 1, and stayed on SPI's Top Ten list for the entire year, either on its own, or as part of the StarForce Trilogy.

Publication history
According to Shannon Appelcline, "The Space Gamer #6 ( June/July 1976) [was] the first issue to offer up substantial articles on other publishers' games — including discussions of McEwan Miniatures' Starguard! (1974) and SPI's then-forthcoming StarSoldier (1977)."

Reception
In Issue 6 of The Space Gamer, Amber ap Llychlyn did not like the rationale for the game, pointing out that in the game, civilians are put to sleep using a psychic field to avoid conflict, and thought this made soldiers, and therefore the entire game, unnecessary.

In Issue 32 of Moves, Phil Kosnett compared StarSoldier to Starship Troopers, published in 1976 by Avalon Hill. After a lengthy comparison, Kosnett concluded that "StarSoldier is an innovative game and Starship Troopers is not. Soldier is science fiction, and Troopers is just a 20th Century land game with funny silhouettes on the unit counters."

In the 1980 book The Complete Book of Wargames, game designer Jon Freeman called this game similar in concept to two other SPI tactical wargames, Sniper! and Patrol. He noted "Games are fairly fluid as units flit from cover to cover, but most boil down to putting out an overwhelming offense while mainting an adequate defense — a combination few units can manage." Freeman gave this game an Overall Evaluation of "Good", concluding, "the game is usually a race to succeed before one side is devastated to the man."

Other reviews and commentary
Fire & Movement #7
The Wargamer Vol.1 #3
Strategist #342
American Wargamer Vol.5, #1
Ann Arbor Wargamer #4
Games & Puzzles #69

References

Board games introduced in 1977
Science fiction board wargames
Simulations Publications games
Wargames introduced in 1977